Ectoedemia hypericifolia is a moth of the family Nepticulidae. It was described by R.K. Puplesis in 1988. It was described from Kyushu, Japan, but is also known from Russia and China.

The larvae feed on Hypericum erectum, Hypericum attenuatum and Hypericum ascyron gebleri.

References

Nepticulidae
Moths of Asia
Moths described in 1982